Natalie Anne Kyriacou OAM (born 1988 in Melbourne, Australia) is an Australian social activist, social entrepreneur and environmentalist. She was appointed the Medal of the Order of Australia for her ‘services to wildlife and environmental conservation and education’ in 2018. She has served on the board of University of Melbourne’s Animal Ethics Committee and is presently a member of the International Union for the Conservation of Nature. She is serving on the advisory board of the Women Leaders Institute. She is also known as the founder and current CEO of My Green World which she founded in 2012 to promote wildlife and environmental conservation issues.

Biography 
Kyriacou was born in Melbourne, Australia. She holds a Bachelor of Journalism and a Master of International Relations from the University of Melbourne. She is the former Australian Director of Dogstar Foundation. In 2012 she founded My Green World. In 2016, Kyriacou developed the environmental education and virtual conservation app, World of the Wild as the part of her wildlife and environmental conservation advocacy which drew considerable media attention. In 2018, she was appointed the Medal of the Order of Australia for her ‘services to wildlife and environmental conservation and education’. In the same year, she has been the finalist of Young Champion of the Earth, organized by United Nations Environment Programme and was featured in Forbes 30 Under 30. She also received 2020 Young Achiever Award for the Hellenic Australian Chamber of Commerce and Industry.

Further reading 

 The Haileyburian - Winter 2019, Page 17.
 Nuwer, Rachel Love. Poached: Inside the Dark World of Wildlife Trafficking. United States: Hachette Books, 2018. ISBN 9780306825514.
 Indigenous Peoples, Poverty, and Development. United Kingdom: Cambridge University Press, 2012. ISBN 9781107020573
Robinson, Lori. Saving Wild: Inspiration From 50 Leading Conservationists. United States: Laurie Robinson, 2016. ISBN 9780996548649

References 

Australian environmentalists
Australian women environmentalists
University of Melbourne alumni
Recipients of the Medal of the Order of Australia
Living people
1988 births